On 3 October 2022 in Beledweyne, Somalia, al-Shabaab used three car bombs to kill at least 20 people.

At Lama-Galaay military base in Beledweyne, a city in Hiran, central Somalia, two car bombs were detonated at around 10:30 am. During the afternoon, another car bomb exploded during its journey to the base. The attacks killed twenty people, including the health minister of Hirshabelle Zakariye Hurre and Hiran's deputy governor for finance and security, Abukar Madey. The bombings also injured 36 others.

Jihadist group al-Shabaab claimed responsibility for the bombings.

See also
Beledweyne bombing
Timeline of al-Shabaab-related events

References

2022 murders in Somalia
2020s building bombings
21st-century mass murder in Somalia
Al-Shabaab (militant group) attacks
Attacks on military installations in the 2020s
Building bombings in Somalia
Islamic terrorist incidents in 2022
Mass murder in 2022
October 2022 crimes in Africa
Somali Civil War (2009–present)
Suicide bombings in 2022
Suicide car and truck bombings in Somalia
October 2022 bombings
Terrorist incidents in Somalia in 2022